Porzinastan (also Romanized as Porzīnastān; also known as Boneh-ye Gholām‘alī, Gholām‘alī, and Porzanastān) is a village in Shoaybiyeh-ye Gharbi Rural District, Shadravan District, Shushtar County, Khuzestan Province, Iran. At the 2006 census, its population was 204, in 43 families.

References 

Populated places in Shushtar County